The men's 200 metres event at the 2002 African Championships in Athletics was held in Radès, Tunisia on August 9–10.

Medalists

Results

Heats
Wind:Heat 1: +0.8 m/s, Heat 2: +0.8 m/s, Heat 3: +1.9 m/s, Heat 4: +1.6 m/s

Semifinals
Wind:Heat 1: +2.3 m/s, Heat 2: +1.7 m/s

Final
Wind: +2.4 m/s

References

2002 African Championships in Athletics
200 metres at the African Championships in Athletics